Sérgio Luís Donizetti (born 7 September 1964 in Campinas, Brazil), best known as João Paulo, is a Brazilian former association footballer, who played as a striker.

Club career

Bari
João Paulo joined Italian club Bari in 1989, and formed a formidable striking partnership with Pietro Maiellaro and later with Romanian Florin Raducioiu. After scoring six goals in 33 Serie A matches in the 1989–90 season, he would score 12 times in the 1990–1991 season, the most memorable of which was a double against A.C. Milan on the penultimate round of the season, thus sealing the title for another club, Sampdoria, which won its first ever (and so far the only) Serie A title in that club's history.

He started the following season brightly and was on his usually excellent form. But in their third match at home to Sampdoria, in torrential rain, his leg was broken by defender Marco Lanna in a tackle along the sidelines which ended his season. It took him an entire year to recover and he stayed on with Bari after its relegation to Serie B for two more seasons until 1994.

International career
João Paulo also played for the Brazilian national team, scoring twice (one goal apiece against Uruguay, and in the notorious match against Argentina) in the Copa América in 1991.

He also competed for Brazil at the 1988 Summer Olympics.

Career statistics

Club

International

Honours

International
Argentina
 Summer Olympics Runners-up : 1988
 Copa América Runners-up : 1991

References

External links
 

1964 births
Living people
Sportspeople from Campinas
Brazilian footballers
Brazilian expatriate footballers
Brazil international footballers
1987 Copa América players
1991 Copa América players
Association football forwards
S.S.C. Bari players
Serie A players
Serie B players
Sport Club Corinthians Paulista players
Guarani FC players
CR Vasco da Gama players
União São João Esporte Clube players
Goiás Esporte Clube players
Campeonato Brasileiro Série A players
Campeonato Brasileiro Série B players
Mito HollyHock players
J2 League players
Expatriate footballers in Italy
Expatriate footballers in Japan
Olympic footballers of Brazil
Olympic silver medalists for Brazil
Footballers at the 1988 Summer Olympics
Olympic medalists in football
Pan American Games gold medalists for Brazil
Medalists at the 1988 Summer Olympics
Pan American Games medalists in football
Footballers at the 1987 Pan American Games
Medalists at the 1987 Pan American Games